GMA Canada presents 30th Anniversary Collection is a three-CD collection commemorating the 30th anniversary of the Gospel Music Association of Canada.  It showcases the history of Christian music in Canada.  The album won the GMA Canada Covenant Award for Special Events/Compilation Album Of The Year in 2008.

Track listing

Disc 1 

I'm So Happy - Hokus Pick
Who Am I - Raylene Scarrott
Small - Amanda Falk
Here To Stay - Greg Sczebel
Today (As For Me And My House) - Brian Doerksen
The Voice Of Creation - Tara Dettman, Deanna Chapman, Monica Joy
What I've Found - Riley Armstrong
I'll Find You There - The Kry
I Know - Carried Away
Waiting - Jake
Come To Me - Jill Paquette
Angels In The Air (Nathan's Song) - The Suspenders
Heaven Is My Home - Arlen Salte
Forever Young - Connie Scott
Cast A Light - Higher Power

Disc 2 

Great Gettin' Up Mornin' - The Four Lads
Seize The Day - Carolyn Arends
Get With The Rhythm - Rhythm & News
Salvation Station - Newworldson
Hunger Mountain - Ali Matthews
Deep Calls To Deep - Steve Bell
Ocean - Ten Shekel Shirt
Water - Matt Brouwer
Go! - Warren Halstrom
Instrument Of Praise - Toronto Mass Choir
That's What I Love About Jesus - Paul Brandt
Power 2 Change - Kelita
He's In The Midst - Torchmen Quartet
You Are My Wholeness - Salmond and Mulder
I'd Rather Have Jesus - George Beverly Shea

Disc 3 

Filled With Your Glory - Starfield
Be My Escape - Relient K
Onward - The Awakening
What It's Like - Downhere
Bounce - Manafest
Life Is - Sharon Riley and Faith Chorale
Once - Londa Larmond
World Vision - Fresh I.E.
Crazy Mary - FM Static
Things Break - Elim Hall
Every Little Thing - Hawk Nelson
Rawkfist - Thousand Foot Krutch
Black Pyramid - Lucerin Blue
He's The Creator - Daniel Band
Walkin' In Faith - Angelica

References 

Contemporary Christian music albums by Canadian artists
2008 compilation albums
Gospel compilation albums